John Fischer (August 1855 – February 9, 1942) was a 19th-century Major League Baseball player. He played pitcher and occasionally first base during the 1884 season for the Philadelphia Keystones of the Union Association and during the 1885 season for the Buffalo Bisons of the National League.  He also played in the Eastern League for part of the 1885 season and in the Pennsylvania State Association in 1886.

Sources

19th-century baseball players
Baseball players from Philadelphia
Major League Baseball pitchers
Philadelphia Keystones players
Buffalo Bisons (NL) players
Williamsport (minor league baseball) players
1855 births
1942 deaths